Pecqueur is a surname. Notable people with the surname include:

Constantin Pecqueur (1801–1887), French economist
Jean-Paul Pecqueur, American poet, critic, and professor
Onésiphore Pecqueur (1792–1852), French mechanical engineer

French-language surnames